Lolo Cecilia Ezeilo is a Nigerian politician, lawyer, philanthropist and television presenter, who has served as Deputy Governor of Enugu State since 2015.

She was first elected to the Enugu State Assembly in 2011, representing the constituency of Ezeagu.

References

Enugu State politicians
Living people
Year of birth missing (living people)